Bradgatia linfordensis is a bush-like Ediacaran fossil. It consists of six or more fronds radiating from a central anchor point at the base. It superficially resembles a compressed cabbage in appearance, although in reality it had a more intricate, fractal mode of organisation. When multiple fossils are found together they are regularly spaced out rather than randomly distributed. It dominates the ecosystem at 8 to 22 cm above the mud surface at the bottom the sea where it grew. It was over-towered by Charnia and Charniodiscus which grew nearby.

Bradgatia has been found in Charnwood Forest in England, at Mistaken Point and Bonavista Peninsula in Newfoundland and also in British Columbia. These fossils are dated from 565 to 575 mya. It was described by Helen Boynton & Ford in 1995 who published in Ediacaran fossils from the Precambrian (Charnian Supergroup) of Charnwood Forest, Leicestershire, England. Mercian Geol 13 (4) March: 178 [Zoological Record Volume 132]. It was named after Bradgate Park.

See also

 List of Ediacaran genera

 Hylaecullulus

References 

 
 

Incertae sedis
Ediacaran life
Rangeomorpha
Ediacaran Europe
Fossil taxa described in 1995